Olney Charter High School, formerly Aspira Charter School at Olney, and Olney High School, is a public high school located in the Olney neighborhood of Philadelphia, Pennsylvania. Previously directly controlled by the School District of Philadelphia, it is now a charter high school. However, Olney will revert to a directly controlled district public high school beginning the 2022-2023 school year.

The original historic building was designed by Irwin T. Catharine and built in 1929–1930.  It is a five-story brick building on a granite base with a five-story tower in the Late Gothic Revival-style. It features Gothic arched openings and limestone details. It was added to the National Register of Historic Places in 1986.

Alumni
 Clair Blank, former author, Beverly Gray mystery series
 Florence Jaffy (Class of 1935), former economist and researcher
 Leon Eisenberg (Class of 1939), former child and social psychiatrist
 Raymond G. Perelman, former philanthropist
 Jerry Ross, former songwriter, record producer, and founder of Heritage Records
 Al Spangler, former professional baseball player, Chicago Cubs, Houston Astros, Los Angeles Angels, and Milwaukee Braves  
 Del Ennis, former professional baseball player, Chicago White Sox, Cincinnati Reds, Philadelphia Phillies, and St. Louis Cardinals
 Debra Sledge (Class of 1972), singer, eldest and founding member of Sister Sledge
 Joni Sledge (Class of 1974), former singer and founding member of Sister Sledge
 Kim Sledge (Class of 1975), singer and founding member of Sister Sledge
 Kathy Sledge (Class of 1977), singer and founding member of Sister Sledge
Gregory Tony (Class of 1997), Sheriff of Broward County, Florida

References

External links
 Olney Charter High School website

School buildings on the National Register of Historic Places in Philadelphia
Gothic Revival architecture in Pennsylvania
School buildings completed in 1930
High schools in Philadelphia
Charter schools in Pennsylvania
1930 establishments in Pennsylvania